Saru Khan (also Romanized as Sārūk Khān and Sarūkhān) is a village in Palanganeh Rural District, in the Central District of Javanrud County, Kermanshah Province, Iran. At the 2006 census, its population was 152, in 31 families.

References 

Populated places in Javanrud County